Orumanayur  is a village in Thrissur district in the state of Kerala, India.

Demographics
 India census, Orumanayur had a population of 14,167 with 6,363 males and 7,804 females. The village has an area code of 0487.

References

Villages in Thrissur district